The play-off round of the 2013–14 UEFA Europa League was played from 22 August to 29 August 2013, to decide 31 of the 48 places in the group stage.

All times were CEST (UTC+2).

Round and draw dates
All draws were held at UEFA headquarters in Nyon, Switzerland.

Matches may also be played on Tuesdays or Wednesdays instead of the regular Thursdays due to scheduling conflicts.

Format
In the play-off round, each tie was played over two legs, with each team playing one leg at home. The team that scored more goals on aggregate over the two legs advanced to the next round. If the aggregate score was level, the away goals rule was applied, i.e., the team that scored more goals away from home over the two legs advanced. If away goals were also equal, then thirty minutes of extra time was played. The away goals rule was again applied after extra time, i.e., if there were goals scored during extra time and the aggregate score was still level, the visiting team advanced by virtue of more away goals scored. If no goals were scored during extra time, the tie was decided by penalty shoot-out.

Teams were seeded based on their UEFA club coefficients at the beginning of the season, with the teams divided into seeded and unseeded pots. A seeded team was drawn against an unseeded team, with the order of legs in each tie decided randomly. Prior to the draws, UEFA may form "groups" in accordance with the principles set by the Club Competitions Committee, but they were purely for convenience of the draw and for ensuring that teams from the same association were not drawn against each other, and did not resemble any real groupings in the sense of the competition.

Teams
A total of 62 teams were involved in the qualifying phase and play-off round (including 15 losers of the Champions League third qualifying round which entered the play-off round). The 31 winners of the play-off round advanced to the group stage to join the 7 automatic qualifiers and 10 losers of the Champions League play-off round.

Below were the participating teams (with their 2013 UEFA club coefficients), grouped by their starting rounds.

Notes

Seeding
A total of 62 teams played in the play-off round: 18 teams which entered in this round, the 29 winners of the third qualifying round, and the 15 losers of the Champions League third qualifying round. The draw was held on 9 August 2013.

Matches
The first legs were played on 22 August, and the second legs were played on 29 August 2013.

|}

Notes

First leg

Second leg

St. Gallen won 5–3 on aggregate.

Rubin Kazan won 5–0 on aggregate.

Rapid Wien won 4–0 on aggregate.

Dynamo Kyiv won 8–3 on aggregate.

Elfsborg won 2–1 on aggregate.

Rijeka won 4–3 on aggregate.

Maccabi Haifa won 3–1 on aggregate.

Trabzonspor won 5–1 on aggregate.

Zulte Waregem won 3–2 on aggregate.

3–3 on aggregate. AZ won on away goals. The match was abandoned after 59 minutes due to a fire at the stadium, and was resumed on 30 August 2013, 11:00, from the point of abandonment.

Sheriff Tiraspol won 3–2 on aggregate.

Esbjerg won 5–3 on aggregate.

Slovan Liberec won 4–2 on aggregate.

Beşiktaş won 3–2 on aggregate.

Swansea City won 6–3 on aggregate.

Apollon Limassol won 2–1 on aggregate.

Genk won 7–2 on aggregate.

1–1 on aggregate. Chornomorets Odesa won 7–6 on penalties.

Thun won 3–1 on aggregate.

Red Bull Salzburg won 7–0 on aggregate.

Eintracht Frankfurt won 4–1 on aggregate.

Standard Liège won 5–1 on aggregate.

Estoril won 4–1 on aggregate.

Dnipro Dnipropetrovsk won 5–1 on aggregate.

Sevilla won 9–1 on aggregate.

Kuban Krasnodar won 3–1 on aggregate.

2–2 on aggregate. Fiorentina won on away goals.

Tottenham Hotspur won 8–0 on aggregate.

Pandurii Târgu Jiu won 2–1 on aggregate.

Real Betis won 8–1 on aggregate.

Statistics

(totals for all earlier rounds and play-off round)

Notes

References

External links
2013–14 UEFA Europa League

Play-off
UEFA Europa League qualifying rounds
August 2013 sports events in Europe